Mast Ali-ye Sofla (also Romanized as Mast ‘Alī-ye Soflá) is a village in Osmanvand Rural District, Firuzabad District, Kermanshah County, Kermanshah Province, Iran. At the 2006 census, its population was 46, in 11 families.

References 

Populated places in Kermanshah County